Joes Mountain may refer to:

 Joes Mountain (Idaho)
 Joes Mountain (Montana)
 Joes Mountain (South Carolina)